Stanhope Nelson Wheatcroft (May 11, 1888 – February 13, 1966) was an American actor of the stage and screen who was primarily active during Hollywood's silent era.

Biography 
Stanhope was born in New York City in 1888 to Nelson Wheatcroft and Adeline Stanhope. Both of his parents were renowned actors and drama teachers born in Europe. Stanhope attended Columbia University in New York City, and reportedly decided to embark upon a career as an actor after his father's death. Broadway plays in which Wheatcroft appeared included Marrying Money (1914), A Gentleman from Mississippi (1908), The Warrens of Virginia (1907), The Movers (1907), Zira (1905), and Nancy Stair (1905). After enjoying popularity during the silent era, his career waned in the 1930s, when his screen credits were primarily for his performances in bit parts.

Wheatcroft died in Los Angeles in 1966, and was survived by his third wife, Faye. His gravesite in at Valhalla Memorial Park in North Hollywood, California.

Selected filmography 

 The Ballet Girl (1916)
 East Lynne (1916)
 Under Two Flags (1916)
 On Dangerous Ground (1917)
 A Modern Cinderella (1917)
 The Corner Grocer (1917)
 God's Man (1917)
 Three X Gordon (1918)
 The Veiled Adventure (1919)
 The Home Town Girl (1919)
 The Blue Bonnet (1919)
 Destiny (1919)
 Her Five-Foot Highness (1920)
 The House of Toys (1920)
 The Breath of the Gods (1920)
 Dr. Jim (1921)
 Cold Steel (1921)
 Greater Than Love (1921)
 Their Mutual Child (1921)
 Two Kinds of Women (1922)
 The Sign of the Rose (1922)
 The Hottentot (1922)
 When Knights Were Cold (1923)
 Breaking Into Society (1923)
 Blow Your Own Horn (1923)
 No More Women (1924)
 The Yankee Consul (1924)
 Broadway or Bust (1924)
 Laughing at Danger (1924)
 Ridin' Pretty (1925)
 Madame Behave (1925)

References

External links
portrait from Destiny 1919 left to right: Stanhope Wheatcroft, William Stowell, Dorothy Phillips, Harry Hilliard 
portrait The Amazing Wife 1919: with Mary MacLaren and Stanhope Wheatcroft(Wisconsin History)

American male film actors
1888 births
Columbia University alumni
1966 deaths
American male silent film actors
20th-century American male actors